The Revolving Paint Dream were a London-based indie band who released two albums and two singles on Creation Records between 1984 and 1989.

History
The band was formed in London in 1983 by Andrew Innes, who had previously played guitar for Alan McGee's band The Laughing Apple, and also contributed to McGee's later band, Biff Bang Pow!. The band also featured Innes's girlfriend Christine Wanless on vocals, Ken Popple (also of Biff bang Pow!) on drums, and part-time contributions on guitar from McGee himself. The band's debut single, the psychedelic "Flowers are in the Sky"/"In the Afternoon", was released in early 1984, the second single on Creation Records. Three years passed before the band's next release, the mini-LP Off to Heaven, Innes now a member of Primal Scream and Wanless now working as a press officer for Creation. The band returned in 1989 with a new drummer, Luke Hayes, and a first full-length album, the experimental Mother Watch Me Burn. The band's final release, the "Sun, Sea, Sand" single, was issued the same year.

A compilation of the band's work was released on the Rev-Ola label - Flowers In The Sky: The Enigma Of The Revolving Paint Dream.

Discography

Albums
Off to Heaven (1987) Creation, CRELP018
Mother Watch Me Burn (1989) Creation, CRELP039
Flowers in the Sky: The Enigma of the Revolving Paint Dream (2006) Rev-Ola, CRREV184

Singles
"Flowers in the Sky" (1984) Creation, CRE002 (UK Indie #27)
"Sun, Sea, Sand" (1989) Creation, CRE062

References

English rock music groups
British indie pop groups
Musical groups established in 1983
Musical groups disestablished in 1989
Creation Records artists